Saligny is a proper name that could be associated with some villages in France or with a family of Romanian intellectuals of French origin.

Romanian Surnames

  Alfons Oscar Saligny (1853 - 1903), member of the Romanian Academy, Romanian chemist, educator, brother of Anghel Saligny
  Alfred Saligny, Romanian educator of French origin, father of Alfons Oscar Saligny and Anghel Saligny
  Anghel Saligny (1854 - 1925), member of the Romanian Academy, its president between 1907 and 1910, Romanian construction engineer, educator, professor, inventor

Places in France
Saligny is the name or part of the name of several communes in France:

 Saligny, Vendée, in the Vendée département
 Saligny, Yonne, in the Yonne département
 Saligny-le-Vif, in the Cher département
 Saligny-sur-Roudon, in the Allier département
 Saligny-le-Roudon, in the Allier département

Places in Romania
 Saligny, Constanța, a commune in Constanţa County